Ater Assembly constituency (formerly, Attair) is one of the 230 Vidhan Sabha (Legislative Assembly) constituencies of Madhya Pradesh state in central India. This constituency came into existence in 1951, as one of the 79 Vidhan Sabha constituencies of the erstwhile Madhya Bharat state.

Overview
Ater (constituency number 9) is one of the 5 Vidhan Sabha constituencies located in Bhind district. This constituency covers the entire Ater tehsil, part of Bhind tehsil and Phuphkalan nagar panchayat.

Ater is part of Bhind Lok Sabha constituency along with seven other Vidhan Sabha segments, namely, Bhind, Lahar, Mehgaon and Gohad in this district and Sewda, Bhander and Datia in Datia district.

Members of Legislative Assembly

As a constituency of Madhya Bharat

 1946: Ram Krishan Dixit, Indian National Congress
 1951: Baboo Ram, Indian National Congress
 1967: Hari Gyan Bohre, Socialist Party

As a constituency of Madhya Pradesh

See also
 Bhind district

References

Bhind district
Assembly constituencies of Madhya Pradesh